Baruunbüren is a sum (district) of Selenge Province in northern Mongolia. Amarbayasgalant Monastery is located 48 km NE from the sum center. In 2008, its population was 2,702.

References 

Populated places in Mongolia
Districts of Selenge Province